was a minor feudal domain under the Tokugawa shogunate of Edo period Japan, located in Shimōsa Province (modern-day Chiba Prefecture), Japan. It was centered on what is now part of the city of Katori. It was ruled for most of its history by the Uchida clan.

History
Omigawai Domain was created for Matsudaira Ietada in 1594, a close associate of Tokugawa Ieyasu. After his death at the Battle of Sekigahara, the domain passed to Doi Toshikatsu, another close retainer of Tokugawa Ieyasu who played a crucial role in the formation of the Tokugawa shogunate. After he was transferred to Sakura Domain, Omigawa was granted to Andō Shigenobu, a retainer of Tokugawa Hidetada, who had also fought at Sekigahara. On his transfer to Takasaki Domain in 1619, Omigawa Domain reverted to tenryō status, directly under the control of the shogunate and administered by a series of  hatamoto -level officials.

Omigawa Domain was revived in 1724 for Uchida Masachika, who was demoted in status from the 15,000 koku  daimyō of Kanuma Domain in Kōzuke Province to 10,000  koku  at Omigawa due to crimes committed by his father Uchida Masayuki. He was allowed to build a jin'ya in what later become the town of Omigawa, Chiba, where his successors continued to rule until the Meiji Restoration. The final daimyō of Omigawa Domain, Uchida Masanori fought on the imperial side during the Boshin War, and later became an officer in the Imperial Japanese Army, serving in combat during the First Sino-Japanese War.

Holdings at the end of the Edo period
As with most domains in the han system, Omigawa Domain consisted of several discontinuous territories calculated to provide the assigned kokudaka, based on periodic cadastral surveys and projected agricultural yields.
Shimōsa Province
17 villages in Katori District
1 village in Kaijō District
Mutsu Province (Iwashiro Province)
9 villages in Shirakawa District

List of daimyō

References

Bolitho, Harold (1974). Treasures among men; the fudai daimyo in Tokugawa Japan. New Haven: Yale University Press.
Kodama Kōta 児玉幸多, Kitajima Masamoto 北島正元 (1966). Kantō no shohan 関東の諸藩. Tokyo: Shin Jinbutsu Ōraisha.

External links
 Genealogy of the lords of Omigawa

Notes

Domains of Japan
1594 establishments in Japan
States and territories established in 1594
1871 disestablishments in Japan
States and territories disestablished in 1871
Shimōsa Province
History of Chiba Prefecture